An araba (from  ) (also arba or aroba) is a carriage (such as a cabriolet or coach), wagon or cart drawn by horses or oxen, used in Turkey and neighboring countries. It is usually heavy and without springs (when it has springs it is called yaylı, shorter form of "yaylı araba" or "araba with springs") and often covered. In modern Turkish, the word araba is used for almost any kind of wheeled device (for eg. el arabası = hand car/trolley). It is also used for a car (automobile).

Notes

References
Araba Clipart. Educational Technology Clearinghouse, University of South Florida. Drawing.
Araba - Open Dictionary.
BIGpedia - Araba - Encyclopedia and Dictionary Online.

Carriages